Kambi Muru is a part of Kibera slum in Nairobi. It borders to Mashimoni, Lindi, Kisumu Ndogo and Makina. Kambi Muru is the site of Kibera Academy. It is also a part of the area of Christ the King Catholic Church. Other parts of Kibera include Laini Saba, Lindi, Makina, Kianda, Gatwekera, Soweto East, Kichinjio, Kisumu Ndogo, Makongeni and Mashimoni.

See also 
Raila
Sarang'ombe
Shilanga 
Siranga

References

Suburbs of Nairobi
Slums in Kenya
Squatting in Kenya